Kelly Moran may refer to:

Kelly Moran (speedway rider) (1960–2010), American male speedway rider
Kelly Moran (musician), American female pianist
Kelly L. Moran, American actress, artist, author and builder.